Music from the World Beyond is the first album by stoner rock quartet The Mushroom River Band.  It was released in 2000 and contains twelve tracks.

Track listing
"To the World Beyond"
"Mud-Crusher"
"Racing"
"Way to Go"
"29' 2½"
"The Mushroom River"
"More Beer"
"Addicted"
"Sir B's Tune"
"A Sad Story"
"Nurse"
"Free"
"Loser's Blues" (bonus track for Japan only)

References

2000 debut albums
The Mushroom River Band albums
MeteorCity albums